A contrast set is a bounded collection of items, each of which could fill the same slot in a given schema, syntactic structure, or other linguistic environment. The seven days of the week, the fifty United States, the eight Hawaiian islands, the letters in the alphabet, the categories "male" and "female," the students in a class, or the flavors on offer at an ice cream store are all examples of contrast sets.

Contrast sets may be relatively natural in origin (such as the eight Hawaiian islands) or relatively conventional (such as the fifty United States). The mastery of certain conventional contrast sets is essential to basic socialization: for example, calendrical units, musical notes, and elements of writing systems like numerals and the alphabet. These contrast sets frequently become the subject of synesthesias.

Linguistic anthropologists Harold Conklin and Charles Frake were the first to work out the concept of the contrast set in the 1950s, and the concept was described in detail in Frake's article "The ethnographic study of cognitive systems."

The Google Sets program attempts to generate a list of the members of a contrast set given a few starter members.

In recent years, the term contrast set has been used extensively in the field of data mining.

References

Anthropology
Linguistics
Structuralism